The 2005 Saint Silvester Road Race was the 81st edition of the Saint Silvester Road Race and held in São Paulo, Brazil, on December 31, 2005. The distance ran by the participating athletes was 15 km.

The men's race was won by Brazil's Marilson Gomes dos Santos, his second victory, whereas the women's event was won by Serbia and Montenegro's Olivera Jevtic, her second triumph.

The podiums were composed of the first seven men and the first five women.  The winners of both the men's event and the women's event received each a money prize of 21 thousand reais (approximately US$9 thousand).

For the amateur athletes participating (over 15 thousand in the men's event), there was an enrollment fee of 55 reais (US$23,50).

Men

Women

See also
2005 in athletics (track and field)

References
 Men's result: Official Saint Silvester results board
 Women's result: Official Saint Silvester results board

External links
Official website (in Portuguese)

2005 in athletics (track and field)
2005 in Brazilian sport
December 2005 sports events in South America
21st century in São Paulo